Andrej Hrabar (born 12 January 1978) is a Slovenian rower. He competed in the men's coxless pair event at the 2004 Summer Olympics.

References

External links
 
 
 

1978 births
Living people
Slovenian male rowers
Olympic rowers of Slovenia
Rowers at the 2004 Summer Olympics
Sportspeople from Koper
21st-century Slovenian people